Joseph Liu may refer to:

Joseph Liu Yuanren (1923–2005), Chinese Roman Catholic bishop
Joseph Liu Xinhong (born 1964), Chinese Roman Catholic bishop
Joseph P. Liu, legal scholar and professor at Boston College Law School
Joseph T. C. Liu, engineer and professor at Brown University

See also
Joseph Lau (born 1951), Hong Kong billionaire, felon and fugitive